S. S. Agarwal (born 1953) is a physician and former national president of the Indian Medical Association.

Early life and education 
He was born in November 1953 to Lt. Shri Kalyan Prasad Sootwale and Smt. Reshmi devi Agarwal in Jaipur in Rajasthan in a family of thread traders known by the name of "sootwalas". Agarwal studied medicine from the Sawai Man Singh Medical College, Jaipur where he pursued his MBBS & MD Medicine education.

In 1982, he established his own hospital “Swasthya Kalyan” in Jaipur.

Indian Medical Association
In September, 2014, Agarwal was elected as the president of the Indian Medical Association.

References 

1953 births
20th-century Indian medical doctors
Living people